Mostazal is a Chilean commune in Cachapoal Province, O'Higgins Region. The capital of the commune is the city of San Francisco de Mostazal.

Geography

Demographics
According to the 2002 census of the National Statistics Institute, Mostazal has 21,866 inhabitants (11,038 men and 10,828 women). Of these, 17,903 (81.9%) lived in urban areas and 3,963 (18.1%) in rural areas. The population grew by 20.6% (3,728 persons) between the 1992 and 2002 censuses.

Administration
As a commune, Mostazal is a third-level administrative division of Chile administered by a municipal council, headed by an alcalde who is directly elected every four years. The 2008-2012 alcalde is Sergio Medel Acosta. The council has the following members:
 Santiago Garate
Within the electoral divisions of Chile, Mostazal is represented in the Chamber of Deputies by Eugenio Bauer (UDI) and Ricardo Rincón  (PDC) as part of the 33rd electoral district, together with Graneros, Codegua, Machalí, Requínoa, Rengo, Olivar, Doñihue, Coinco, Coltauco, Quinta de Tilcoco and Malloa. The commune is represented in the Senate by Andrés Chadwick Piñera (UDI) and Juan Pablo Letelier Morel (PS) as part of the 9th senatorial constituency (O'Higgins Region).

See also
 Sun Monticello

References

External links
  Municipality of Mostazal

Communes of Chile
Populated places in Cachapoal Province